Yonghwasan is a mountain in the city of Chuncheon and the county of Hwacheon, Gangwon-do in South Korea.

See also
 List of mountains in Korea

Notes

References
 

Mountains of South Korea
Hwacheon County
Chuncheon
Mountains of Gangwon Province, South Korea